Cherry Venture was a 1600-ton cargo ship of Scandinavian origin. It ran aground on Teewah Beach in South East Queensland, Australia on 6 July 1973 and remained on the beach for 34 years until its removal in early 2007.

History 
The ship, originally named the Scania, was built in Gothenburg, Sweden in 1945. She was later called the Slott and Timor Venture. In 1973, she was owned by Sea Tankers Pty. Ltd. of Singapore and known as the Cherry Venture.

Cause of the wreck

On the day of the storm the ship was traveling from Auckland to Brisbane under the command of Captain Seluenu.

Cherry Venture was wrecked due to a combination of severe storms and a lack of cargo. The ship battled against the waves for hours, facing directly into the wind and making no headway before her captain issued a mayday call at 6:50am. The 9 Squadron RAAF, based at Amberley, answered that call, dispatching Iroquois rescue helicopters fitted with winches to assist in the evacuation of the ship. However, the 70km winds, high swell, and near impenetrable cloud cover, forced the military helicopters and their veteran crews to land at Maroochydore and await changes in the conditions.

As conditions remained catastrophic for Cherry Venture the decision was made to evacuate, but lifeboats were ripped clean from their fastenings by the brutal waves leaving crewmembers stranded. It was hours later, when the ship had already found its way up onto the sands, that a local aviator was able to assist the Iroquois helicopters via radio through a daring, low-altitude flight path that has been considered some of the most dangerous and well-executed flight mission undertaken by Australian defense forces during peace time. The flight path they undertook was previously unknown to RAAF forces and remained well below the cloud line, relying heavily on local topography to provide shelter from the blistering winds. Though the helicopters were able to airlift all of Cherry Venture's 24 crew to safety, including two pet monkeys, the ship was unfortunately too far ashore to be assisted. 

The unladen ship sat high in the water, which, when combined with the high tides and strong swell, propelled it to a point far enough up the sand that it could not be successfully re-floated, despite attempts that involved dredging the beach.

Salvage attempts
Salvage rights to the wreck were subsequently purchased by Peter Vagellas, an Australian entrepreneur, who had intended to re-float the vessel and convert it into a luxury liner and floating casino to service the Great Barrier Reef. In 1977 he began attempts to refloat the ship. Eight major salvage attempts over the years failed, after which a fire gutted the interior of the ship and Vagellas abandoned his efforts after spending over a quarter of a million dollars on the endeavour.

Public interest

The wreck was a popular stopping point for tourists en route between Noosa and Fraser Island, and was photographed often. Despite safety warnings regarding the rusting structure's unsound nature, visitors would often climb the wreck and explore the ship. The site was popular with graffiti artists; over time the ship became completely covered with scrawled messages and artwork.

Removal

In December 1985, the ship's stainless steel propeller was removed using a thermal lance by Bill, Tony and Bruce Dunne of Caloundra. It was later restored by the Rainbow Beach Business and Tourism Association and then mounted as a monument in the township of Rainbow Beach.

In late 2006 it was announced that the wreck would be demolished due to increasing dangers posed by its deterioration, including exposed asbestos in the engine room.

The removal process, which necessitated cordoning off a section of public highway which runs along the beach next to the wreck, began on 13 February 2007.

2013 hull recovery
After the demolition of the wreck in 2007, the state government ordered the site to be buried for the safety of visitors. In 2013, Cyclone Oswald and local storms caused severe erosion at the site which removed the layer of sand above the remains of the hull. This sparked the tourism business as the wreck was and now still is a special example of Australia's shipping history.

See also

Lists of shipwrecks

References

External links
 The Cherry Venture on Google Maps
 The Wreck of the Cherry Venture, State Library of Queensland blog.

Shipwrecks of Queensland
Cargo ships of Sweden
Maritime incidents in 1973
South East Queensland